Kleber Romero (born February 14, 1976 in Santa Cecília do Pavão) is a former Brazilian football player. He is currently manager of Treze Futebol Clube.

Playing career
Kleber Romero is notable for his appearance in the J2 League for Consadole Sapporo in 1999, and for playing in Campeonato Brasileiro Série B with Sport Club do Recife in 2006, São Caetano in 2007, Vila Nova in 2008 and Campinense in 2009.

He has also represented a number of other Brazilian clubs, including Matsubara, Mirassol, Maringá, Treze, Criciúma and Rio Branco-SP.

Managerial career
Kleber Romero was appointed sporting director of the football department of Campinense in October 2012. After winning the 2013 Copa do Nordeste he left at the end of the 2014 season to take up the same role with CSE-AL.

He was appointed assistant coach by Treze in October 2017, and has taken interim charge of the team on a number of occasions, the most recent occasion being March 2019.

References

External links

1976 births
Living people
Brazilian footballers
Brazilian football managers
Association football midfielders
Brazilian expatriate footballers
Expatriate footballers in Japan
J2 League players
Campeonato Brasileiro Série B players
Campeonato Brasileiro Série C managers
Sociedade Esportiva Matsubara players
Mirassol Futebol Clube players
Grêmio de Esportes Maringá players
Hokkaido Consadole Sapporo players
Campinense Clube players
Treze Futebol Clube players
Criciúma Esporte Clube players
Sport Club do Recife players
Associação Desportiva São Caetano players
Vila Nova Futebol Clube players
Rio Branco Esporte Clube players
Treze Futebol Clube managers